Prince Valiant: The Story-Telling Game is the official role-playing game based on Hal Foster's comic strip of the same name. Created by Greg Stafford the game was first published by Stafford's company, Chaosium, in 1989. A second edition has followed in 2018.

Setting
With Prince Valiant: The Story-Telling Game, illustrated by Hal Foster, Greg Stafford designed his second Arthurian role-playing game. The first was King Arthur Pendragon, published by Chaosium in 1985. Game players take on characters who live in the same shared universe under King Arthur's rule, although Prince Valiant's style is less pseudo-historical than Pendragon's and closer to the spirit of Foster's original comic strip.

Mechanics
The actual game mechanics are deliberately simple. Aiming to help beginners (especially kids), the game emphasizes story-telling prior to the use of cluttering and exceeding simulation rules: every playable character has only two attributes, Brawn and Presence, with seven points to distribute between them when creating the character. Action resolution is decided by coin tosses, which play the role of dice, the attribute point number being then equivalent of the number of tossed coins.

Translations
In October 1990, the game was translated and published into Spanish by the Spanish publishing house Joc Internacional (translator: Juan Ignacio Sánchez Pérez).

See also
 Prince Valiant
 Hal Foster
 Greg Stafford

References

External links
 Review of Prince Valiant: The Story-Telling Game on the role-playing game site RPG.net
 Prince Valiant® Storytelling Game by Greg Stafford Kickstarter

Games based on Arthurian legend
Chaosium games
Fantasy role-playing games
Greg Stafford games
Role-playing games based on comics
Role-playing games introduced in 1989
Prince Valiant
Role-playing game systems